"Waitin' in School" is a rock and roll song written by Johnny Burnette and Dorsey Burnette. The song was recorded by Ricky Nelson, and peaked at number 18 in the U.S Billboard Hot 100 of 1958.  It is considered one of the best examples of Nelson's contributions to rockabilly.  Joe Maphis provided the lead guitar and solo on this record.

In popular culture

 Ricky Nelson performed the song in The Adventures of Ozzie and Harriet sitcom, episode "Picture in Rick's Notebook".
 Gary Shorelle performed the song in the film Pulp Fiction.

Chart performance

See also

Ricky Nelson

References

Return To Macon County movie, starring Nick Nolte, and Don Johnson.  (1975)

External links
"The Adventures of Ozzie & Harriet" Picture in Rick's Notebook (1958)

Ricky Nelson songs
1957 songs
Songs written by Dorsey Burnette
Songs written by Johnny Burnette
Imperial Records singles